Revi is a surname and male given name. Notable people with this name include:

Surname
 Alfred Revi, Austrian field hockey player
 Juan Revi (born 1986), Indonesian football player

Given name
 Revi Karunakaran
 Revi Soekatno
 Vineeth Revi Mathew (born 1984), Indian basketball player